James Robert Stewart (6 March 1931 – 3 January 2008) was a British racing driver from Scotland who participated in a single Formula One World Championship Grand Prix, driving for Ecurie Ecosse. He was born in Milton, West Dunbartonshire. He also competed in several non-Championship Formula One races. He was the elder brother of Jackie Stewart.

Stewart later worked in the garage industry and worked closely with anti-alcohol projects in Scotland.

Complete Formula One World Championship results
(key)

References

External links
 Obituary in The Times, 8 January 2008

1931 births
2008 deaths
Ecurie Ecosse Formula One drivers
Sportspeople from West Dunbartonshire
Scottish Formula One drivers
Scottish racing drivers
World Sportscar Championship drivers